Ryan Harrison Leone (August 3, 1985 – July 2, 2022) was an American novelist, film producer, artist, and prison reform activist. He was best known for his semi-autobiographical addiction novel Wasting Talent.

Biography

Career 
Based on his experiences, Leone wrote his first novel while serving a five-year federal prison sentence for his involvement with an international heroin cartel called The Mendoza Clan. The Mendoza Clan was an Oaxacan Indian family that operated a heroin ring out of Mexico and reportedly smuggled millions of dollars worth of drugs into the United States for over two decades.  Leone quickly signed contracts for two major television shows and in 2017 sold the film rights to William De Los Santos, screenwriter and producer of the addiction film Spun.

In the January/February 2018 issue of Penthouse magazine, De Los Santos said, "It captivated me with the poetry in how he told the story." when asked what attracted him to Leone's debut novel. Bret Easton Ellis, author of American Psycho, reviewed the book favorably on his podcast, stating: “A first novel that seems to flash out of a writer... One of the more fucked up and honest depictions of addiction I’ve ever read .. A Tarantino-esque journey into so-cal madness. One of the better books I’ve read about millennials by a millennial.”

Idiot Savant: The Savage Life of Ryan Leone, a documentary about Leone's drug addiction and outlaw lifestyle went into production in the fall of 2017. Jim Uhls screenwriter of Fight Club, had expressed his desire to be involved in the production of the film.

In 2018, Leone launched a non-profit organization called The Prodigy Foundation, in an effort to end mass incarceration and expand literacy in American prisons.

Leone released a comedy album of spoken word stories in 2020 called Drug Stories for Truckers: Volume One. The satirical album chronicles Leone’s emotional breakdown between his second and third prison term. The album featured guest appearances from a number of his well known friends including  Johnny Depp, Tommy Chong, Nick Stahl, "Freeway" Rick Ross, Simon Rex, and George Jung.

Death 
On July 2, 2022, news broke of the 36-year-old's death. News of his death broke online which followed with a slew of tributes to the late activist. It was confirmed by Ryan Leone’s fiancée Karina Franco. He was admitted to hospital a few days prior and was suffering from a number of health issues stemming from a broken finger and pneumonia. 

On June 29 Leone had posted on Instagram "I broke my finger. Then, completely unrelated, I went to the hospital twice in a week. First time they told me I had pneumonia. I got a second opinion. No pneumonia. This is respiratory and gastrointestinal issues stemming from being on way too much Methadone 170 mgs!! My stomach becomes so bloated it feels like some rapid ever-expanding Willy Wonka inflated sanction." He went on about a rap project he was hoping to attend and concluded his post with a heartbreaking statement: "I need to stop being so reckless. I’m a dad now. Amen."

Works 

 Wasting Talent (2014)
 Drug Stories For Truckers: Volume I (2020)

References

External links
Ryan Leone article at Gonzo Today.

1985 births
2022 deaths
21st-century American novelists
American activists
American film producers
American male novelists
American people convicted of drug offenses
Place of death missing
21st-century American male writers
People from Framingham, Massachusetts
Writers from Massachusetts